Darren Foreman may refer to:

Beardyman (born 1982), beatboxer, real name Darren Foreman
Darren Foreman (footballer) (born 1968), English former footballer